Steveless is a band from Pontyclun, South Wales, comprising Dan Newman and Ian Cosgrove. They were a favourite of John Peel, for whom they recorded a session in 2004. Peel summed them up thus;

Steveless were identified as John Peel's last great love' and were mentioned in his autobiography Margrave of the Marshes.

Actually, by the time Peel had discovered them, Steveless had been reduced to a one-man band in the form of Dan Newman, now at university in Bristol and a respected member of the thriving Bristol music scene.

In 2005 Steveless became a 4-piece super-group featuring members of other popular Bristol bands, Simon Jarvis from Big Joan, Matt Williams of Team Brick and Rhys Herdman from White Trash Ambition. Despite this formation, the band still managed to stay bereft of Steves. The bass duties have recently changed hands due to other commitments, and now the low noise is provided by Mantis from the band Geisha.

The band released their debut album (and in fact Dan's first official release) 'Popular Music In Theory' on Cherryade in October 2005.  The album went on to garner widespread critical acclaim and in December 2005 the lead track from the album, 'Bored', reached number 9 in the Radio 1 Festive Fifty.

July 2007 saw the band release their second album 'Mistakes In All The Right Places' on Cherryade, which has been even better received on radio and in the music press.

Dan 'Steveless' Newman is also still playing and recording on his own under the Steveless moniker, and also with Swansea based artist Syd Howells as 'Steveless and Syd Howells'. Together they have recorded a number of self-released eps. As well as releasing several tracks through various compilation albums, they have an upcoming ep on The International Lo-Fi Underground. In October 2005 Dan recorded a short solo set as part of Radio 1's One Music one-man bands special.

Dan Newman is also a member of up-and-coming Bristol band Girl From Headquarters. He is now giving away every Steveless track ever recorded on the Steveless Tunes blog.

References

External links
Steveless Tunes Blog
Steveless MySpace
Steveless at the BBC

Welsh rock music groups